8026 Johnmckay, provisional designation , is a binary Hungaria asteroid and very slow rotator from the inner regions of the asteroid belt, approximately 2 kilometers in diameter. It was discovered on 8 May 1991, by American astronomer Eleanor Helin at the U.S. Palomar Observatory, California, and later named for NASA test pilot John B. McKay.

Classification and orbit 

The bright E-type asteroid is a member of the Hungaria family, which form the innermost dense concentration of asteroids in the Solar System. Johnmckay orbits the Sun in the inner main-belt at a distance of 1.8–2.1 AU once every 2 years and 8 months (976 days). Its orbit has an eccentricity of 0.08 and an inclination of 20° with respect to the ecliptic. The first observation was made at the discovering observatory in 1989, extending the asteroid's observation arc by almost 2 years prior to its discovery.

Diameter estimates 

According to the survey carried out by the NEOWISE mission of NASA's Wide-field Infrared Survey Explorer, Johnmckay measures 1.7 kilometers in diameter and its surface has an exceptionally high albedo of 0.81, while the Collaborative Asteroid Lightcurve Link assumes a standard albedo for Hungaria asteroids of 0.30, and calculates a diameter of 2.5 kilometers, based on an absolute magnitude of 14.9.

Lightcurves

Primary 

Two rotational lightcurves of Johnmckay were obtained for this asteroid from photometric observations by U.S. astronomer Brian D. Warner at the Palmer Divide Station (PDO), Colorado. In August 2010, the first lightcurve gave a long rotation period of  hours with a brightness variation of 1.0 in magnitude.

This makes Johnmckay one of the Top 100+ slowest rotators known to exist.

Moon 

In 2010 a small asteroid moon was discovered around this asteroid. It has an orbital period of  hours, while observations at the PDO gave it a period of 2.2981 and 14.93 hours, respectively.

Naming 

This minor planet was named in memory of NASA test pilot John B. McKay (1922–1975), one of the first pilots assigned to fly the North American X-15. He was also assigned to the X-1E and to the D-558-II. He died in 1975, from injuries he had sustained during a X-15 crash. The approved naming citation was published by the Minor Planet Center on 7 February 2012.

References

External links 
 Lightcurve plot of 8026 Johnmckay (1991 JA1), Palmer Divide Observatory, B. D. Warner (2010)
 Asteroids with Satellites, Robert Johnston, johnstonsarchive.net
 Asteroid Lightcurve Database (LCDB), query form (info )
 Dictionary of Minor Planet Names, Google books
 Asteroids and comets rotation curves, CdR – Observatoire de Genève, Raoul Behrend
 Discovery Circumstances: Numbered Minor Planets (5001)-(10000) – Minor Planet Center
 
 

008026
Discoveries by Eleanor F. Helin
Named minor planets
008026
008026
19910508